Suffasia is a genus of ant spiders in the family Zodariidae, containing eight species restricted to India, Nepal, and Sri Lanka.

Species
 Suffasia ala (Simon, 1893) — India
 Suffasia attidiya Benjamin & Jocqué, 2000 — Sri Lanka
 Suffasia kanchenjunga Ono, 2006 — Nepal
 Suffasia keralaensis Sudhikumar, Jocqué & Sebastian, 2009 — India
 Suffasia mahasumana Benjamin & Jocqué, 2000 — Sri Lanka
 Suffasia martensi Ono, 2006 — Nepal
 Suffasia tigrina (Simon, 1893) — India
 Suffasia tumegaster Jocqué, 1992 — Nepal

References

Zodariidae
Araneomorphae genera
Spiders of Asia